Trans-resveratrol di-O-methyltransferase (ROMT, resveratrol O-methyltransferase, pterostilbene synthase) is an enzyme with systematic name S-adenosyl-L-methionine:trans-resveratrol 3,5-O-dimethyltransferase. This enzyme catalyses the following chemical reaction

 2 S-adenosyl-L-methionine + trans-resveratrol  2 S-adenosyl-L-homocysteine + pterostilbene (overall reaction)
 (1a) S-adenosyl-L-methionine + trans-resveratrol  S-adenosyl-L-homocysteine + 3-methoxy-4',5-dihydroxy-trans-stilbene
 (1b) S-adenosyl-L-methionine + 3-methoxy-4',5-dihydroxy-trans-stilbene  S-adenosyl-L-homocysteine + pterostilbene

The enzyme catalyses the biosynthesis of pterostilbene from resveratrol.

References

External links 
 

EC 2.1.1